The Grand Central Atelier is an art school in the Long Island City neighborhood of the borough of Queens in New York City.

Founded in 2006 by New York artist Jacob Collins, the school focuses on training artists in the classical art tradition.

See also

 List of art schools

References

External links

Educational institutions in the United States with year of establishment missing
Art schools in New York City
Universities and colleges in Queens, New York